Lewis & Humphreys Block is a historic building in Victoria, British Columbia, Canada.  Originally separate, they were constructed in 1891 on lower Yates Street.

See also
 List of historic places in Victoria, British Columbia

References

External links
 

1891 establishments in Canada
Buildings and structures completed in 1891
Buildings and structures in Victoria, British Columbia